High Water is a collaborative studio album by El-P featuring The Blue Series Continuum. It was released through Thirsty Ear Recordings on March 9, 2004. It peaked at number 46 on the Billboard Independent Albums chart.

Critical reception

High Water was met with generally positive reviews. At Metacritic, which assigns a weighted average score out of 100 to reviews from mainstream critics, the album received an average score of 71 based on 9 reviews.

Reviewing for The Village Voice in September 2004, Tom Hull said this album "shows more meat" than the previous two Blue Series Continuum albums, "probably because El-P carves what the band gives him rather than smothering it in sauce." Thom Jurek of AllMusic gave the album 4 stars out of 5, saying: "In sum, it's a moody and haunting record with a few highs, a few lows, and lots of shades of blue to make your way through." David Moore of Pitchfork gave the album a 7.2 out of 10, saying, "El-P's edits and subtle production work strengthens the ensemble's more indulgent moments." He added, "El-P sometimes seems reluctant to interfere with the ensemble's improvisation, which is a shame considering that the album's strongest tracks show him taking the reins from individual players." Meanwhile, Stefan Braidwood of PopMatters said, "El-P has now proven beyond all doubt that he merits a further word in his description, and that word is: genius."

Track listing

Personnel
Credits adapted from liner notes.

 El-P – composition, production, arrangement, mixing
 Matthew Shipp – piano
 Daniel Carter – reeds, flute
 Steve Swell – trombone
 Roy Campbell – trumpet
 William Parker – double bass
 Guillermo E. Brown – drums
 Harry Keys – vocals (7)
 Tim Conklin – recording
 Scott Hull – mastering
 Cynthia Fetty – art direction, photography
 Loretta Wong – design, layout

Charts

References

External links
 
 

2004 albums
El-P albums
Thirsty Ear Recordings albums
Albums produced by El-P